Silvio Ivandija (born 20 September 1964) is a Croatian former handball player and current handball coach for MRK Sesvete.

Honours

As a player
Osijek
Regional league of Slavonia - North (1): 1983-84

Celje
Yugoslav Second League (1): 1990-91
1. NLB (3): 1993-94, 1994-95, 1995-96
Slovenian Cup (3): 1994, 1995, 1996

Pallamano Trieste
Serie A (1): 1992-93
Coppa Italia (1): 1993

Zagreb
Croatian First A League (3): 1996-97, 1997-98, 2000-01
Croatian Cup (3): 1997, 1998, 2001

As a coach
Zagreb
Croatian Cup (1): 2003

Izviđač
Handball Championship of Bosnia and Herzegovina (1): 2017-18

References

Croatian male handball players
RK Zamet players
RK Zagreb coaches
Yugoslav male handball players
Sportspeople from Osijek
1964 births
Living people
Croatian handball coaches